Jurassic Park III could refer to:

 Jurassic Park III, the 2001 feature film and the third film in the series
 Jurassic Park III (score), the musical score to the 2001 film
Jurassic Park III, the arcade game
Jurassic Park III: Park Builder, the Game Boy Advance simulation game
Jurassic Park III: The DNA Factor, the Game Boy Advance side scrolling game
Jurassic Park III: Island Attack, the Game Boy Advance action game
Jurassic Park III: Danger Zone!, the 2001 PC action game
Jurassic Park III: Dino Defender, the 2001 PC action game